The Flirt is a 1922 American silent comedy film directed by Hobart Henley. The cast included George Nichols, Lloyd Whitlock, Lydia Knott, William Welsh, Helen Jerome Eddy, Bert Roach, Eileen Percy, Edward Hearn, Harold Goodwin, and Buddy Messinger. It was based on Tarkington's 1913 novel The Flirt. It was a Carl Laemmle film produced by Universal Film Manufacturing Company. The story features a girl who insist on having things her way. A film edition of the book was published in 1922 with film stills. Sheet music for a theme song, "The Flirt; Whose Heart Are You Breaking To-Night" was also released in 1922.

Plot
As described in a film magazine review, the Madison family is short of money though Papa Madison's name is good. Cora, one daughter, is selfish, lazy, and intolerant, but pretty. Her sister Laura is a reflection of her gentle mother, while Hendrick is the little pest of a kid brother. Cora's flirtations with the men of the town, the struggle of the father to make a living, how he becomes involved in a confidence game, and the eventual triumph of love make a blend of drama and comedy.

Cast

Preservation
The Flirt is considered to be a lost film.

References

External links

1922 films
1920s English-language films
Silent American comedy films
1922 comedy films
Universal Pictures films
Films directed by Hobart Henley
American silent feature films
American black-and-white films
1920s American films